Zhao Yan (born July 23, 1992) is a Chinese ice dancer. With his skating partner, Chen Hong, he is the 2017 Asian Winter Games bronze medalist and 2017 Chinese national champion. The two made their Grand Prix debut at the 2016 Cup of China. They placed tenth at the 2017 Four Continents Championships in Gangneung, South Korea.

Programs 
(with Chen)

Competitive highlights 
GP: Grand Prix; CS: Challenger Series

 With Chen

References

External links 
 

1992 births
Chinese male ice dancers
Living people
Figure skaters from Harbin
Figure skaters at the 2017 Asian Winter Games
Medalists at the 2017 Asian Winter Games
Asian Games bronze medalists for China
Asian Games medalists in figure skating
Competitors at the 2015 Winter Universiade
Competitors at the 2017 Winter Universiade